Marie McDonough (15 November 1917 – 18 October 2013) was an Australian cricketer. McDonough played one Test match for the Australia national women's cricket team.

McDonough played six seasons for Western Australia Womens Cricket Team and was its captain in three seasons.

References

1917 births
2013 deaths
Australia women Test cricketers